Motif Number 1, located on Bradley Wharf in the harbor town of Rockport, Massachusetts, is a replica of a former fishing shack well known to students of art and art history as "the most often-painted building in America." The original structure was built in 1840 and destroyed in the Blizzard of 1978, but an exact replica was constructed that same year.

Built in the 1840s as Rockport was becoming home to a colony of artists and settlement of fishermen, the shack became a favorite subject of painters due to the composition and lighting of its location as well as being a symbol of New England maritime life. Painter Lester Hornby (1882–1956) is believed to be the first to call the shack "Motif Number 1," a reference to its being the favorite subject of the town's painters, and the name achieved general acceptance. It appeared in the work of Aldro Hibbard and of impressionist Harry Aiken Vincent who arrived in Rockport in 1917.

In the 1930s, painter John Buckley used the shack as his studio. He sold it to the town in 1945, dedicated "In 1945, the town of Rockport purchased the Motif as a monument to Rockporters who had served in the Armed Services." The town, recognizing its iconic value, has taken pains to preserve both its structure and appearance, finding a red paint which appears weather-beaten even when new, and keeping the area clear of overhead wires, traffic signs and advertising.

References

External links

 How Motif No.1 Got Its Name

Landmarks in Massachusetts
Rockport, Massachusetts
Buildings and structures in Essex County, Massachusetts
Fishing in the United States